Faldo is a surname. Notable people with the surname include:

 John Faldo (1633–1690), English nonconformist minister and controversialist
 Nick Faldo (born 1957), English golfer
 Stephen Faldo, skipper of the pleasure boat Marchioness

Fictional characters:
 Waldo Faldo, character from the American television series Family Matters

See also